Artur Augusto Camolas Júnior (born 15 March 1904 - deceased) was a Portuguese footballer who played as a goalkeeper.

Football career 

Camolas gained 4 caps for Portugal and made his debut against France on 16 March 1927 in Lisbon, in a 4-0 victory.

External links 
 
 

1904 births
Portuguese footballers
Association football goalkeepers
Vitória F.C. players
Portugal international footballers
Year of death missing